The Dadoji Konddev Stadium, sometimes called SR Bhosle Krida Sankul Stadium by some sources, is a sports stadium in Thane, Maharashtra, India. It is named after Dadoji Konddev and it is currently used mostly for training.

Its main ground has been built for cricket with an in-built six lane running track for athletes. The complex also includes 5 badminton courts, a gym, a table tennis hall, 2 squash courts, a billiards room, rami room, hall, bar room, and a canteen.

Athletics and badminton coaching by the Thane Municipal Corporation's Badminton Association has also been conducted here since 1987.

The stadium also hosts a number of private athletics coaching classes as well like Track and Field Masters Club, Achievers Club, Seven Stars.
The spectator capacity is 33,000. The Stadium is closed on Monday, and on the rest of the days the ground is reserved for athletics from 6am to 9:30 am and 5:30 pm to 9:00 pm  and for cricket from 9:30 to 1:00 pm and 4:00 pm to 5:30 pm.

Dadoji Stadium is only stadium in Thane with a 400-meter running track and many of the athletics events like the Mayor's Cup  where 60+ schools and 2000 athletes typically participate  and Arya Krida Mandal events are conducted here.

The ground also hosts a number of annual sports events of various schools in Thane and acts as a venue for cultural events.

WPL auction 
The players' auction for upcoming Women's Premier League (WPL) will be held in this stadium.

References

Football venues in Maharashtra
Cricket grounds in Maharashtra
Sports venues in Thane
Buildings and structures in Thane
Sport in Thane
Year of establishment missing